Ryu Sung-hyun (born 22 October 2002) is a South Korean artistic gymnast. He won the gold medal in the floor exercise at the 2019 Junior World Artistic Gymnastics Championships held in Győr, Hungary.

In 2020, he won the gold medal in the floor exercise in Melbourne, Australia as part of the FIG Artistic Gymnastics World Cup series. He competed for the Korean team at the 2020 Summer Olympics in Tokyo, Japan.

References

External links 

 

Living people
2002 births
Place of birth missing (living people)
South Korean male artistic gymnasts
Medalists at the Junior World Artistic Gymnastics Championships
Gymnasts at the 2020 Summer Olympics
Olympic gymnasts of South Korea
21st-century South Korean people